Alfred James Webb ( – ) was an English-born international rugby union footballer who played club rugby for Abertillery, and county rugby for Monmouthshire. He won 20 caps for Wales and was part of the 1910 touring British Isles team to South Africa.

Webb was a strong forward player who was part of three Triple Crown Wales teams, and won 19 consecutive caps, all while playing for a 'second class' team, normally unpopular with selectors. On 22 December 1908, Webb while captain of Abertillery, lead his team against the first touring Australian team. The resulting 3-3 draw is one of the greatest days in the club's history.

Webb is remembered as a powerful scrummager, strong at line-outs and mauls. He was a modest, proud, and defiantly loyal man.

International career
After a strong performance against the touring South Africans with county team Monmouthshire, Webb was capped for Wales against Scotland in February 1907. He would play for Wales a further 19 times. His final game was against Scotland in 1912 in which he led the pack in a rousing victory. The selectors though felt Webb was too old and too slow and he was dropped. Webb would later argue with the Welsh Rugby Union selectors and leave the game of rugby union. He joined St. Helens but would only play five matches for the team.

International matches played
Wales
  1908,
  1908, 1909, 1910, 1911, 1912
  1908, 1909, 1910, 1911
  1908, 1909, 1910, 1911
  1907, 1908, 1909, 1910, 1911, 1912

British Isles
  1910 (x3)

Bibliography

References

External links
Profile at saints.org.uk

1882 births
1955 deaths
Abertillery RFC players
British & Irish Lions rugby union players from Wales
English people of Welsh descent
English rugby league players
English rugby union players
Monmouthshire County RFC players
People from Coleford, Gloucestershire
Rugby league players from Gloucestershire
Rugby union players from Gloucestershire
St Helens R.F.C. players
Wales international rugby union players